The Emmett Leahy Award is given annually to individuals who have had major impact on the field of information management.
The award has been given since 1967, and honors Emmett Leahy, a pioneer in records management.

Organization 

The award is sponsored by Preservica, a digital preservation company.
The award was formerly sponsored by the Association of Records Managers and Administrators (ARMA).

The Emmett Leahy Award Committee is responsible for selecting the annual Emmett Leahy Award recipient. 
The committee is independent and not associated with any other organization. It is composed of the past winners of the award.

List of Recipients

1999 to present

Award winners since 1999 are:

1985 to 1998

Award winners before 1999 are:

1967 to 1980

The Emmett Leahy Award was created by Rodd Exelbert, founder of Information and Records Management magazine.
The award was for "a man or woman whose unique contributions to records control, filing, and information retrieval have advanced the information and records management profession."
It was named after Emmett Leahy  (1910–1964) with the permission of Betty Leahy, his widow.
The first award was presented to Ed Ross at the 1967 ARMA Annual Meeting.
In 1980 Exelbert left the IRM magazine, and ARMA decided that the award should no longer be presented at its meeting, since ARMA did not select the recipients.
The first version of the award therefore ended that year.

See also 

 Records management
 Archival science

References 

Awards established in 1967
Information management
Lists of award winners